Swatara may refer to:

Communities 
 Swatara, Minnesota, an unincorporated community in Aitkin County
 Lower Swatara Township, Dauphin County, Pennsylvania
 Swatara Township, Dauphin County, Pennsylvania
 Swatara Township, Lebanon County, Pennsylvania
 Swatara, Derry Township, Pennsylvania, an unincorporated community in Dauphin County

Streams 
 Swatara Creek, a tributary of the Susquehanna River in Pennsylvania
 Little Swatara Creek, a tributary of the above

Ships 
 USS Swatara (1865), a wooden, screw sloop, launched in 1865, dismantled in 1872
 USS Swatara (1872), a screw sloop, launched in 1873, decommissioned in 1891

Other 
 Swatara State Park, in Pennsylvania

See also